The Office of Boating Safety is the division of Transport Canada that is responsible for overseeing regulations, standards, policies, enforcement, and technical services for pleasure craft and marine recreation. The OBS delivers prevention-based programs to reduce the safety risks and environmental impacts of boating on Canadian waters.

See also 
 Pleasure Craft Operator Card - mandatory boater education in Canada

Relations

External links
 http://www.tc.gc.ca/boatingsafety/

Transport Canada

Water transport in Canada
Regulators of Canada